Alberto Curamil (born c. 1974) is a Chilean and Mapuche indigenous leader from the Araucanía Region. He was awarded the Goldman Environmental Prize in 2019, for his efforts to protect the Cautín River from hydroelectric development projects.

In 2018, he was arrested and jailed for 15 months for armed robbery but was later acquitted of all charges and released in December 2019. In April 2021, he sustained injuries after a confrontation with police which led to him being hit with riot shotgun pellets.

He holds the position of lonco, a chief of several communities.

References 

20th-century Mapuche people
21st-century Mapuche people
Lonkos
Indigenous activists of the Americas
Chilean activists
Chilean environmentalists
Indigenous peoples and the environment
People from Araucanía Region
Year of birth missing (living people)
Living people
Goldman Environmental Prize awardees